The 2019 Latin American Series is the seventh edition of the Latin American Series baseball tournament.

The competition is taking place in Veracruz, Mexico from January 26 to February 1, 2019.

Qualified teams 

 Teams highlighted in red withdrew from the competition. Due to the withdrawal of Curaçaoan team,  Sta. Maria Pirates-Chippie, the host Veracruz Winter League sent a second team in their place.

Venues 
Four venues are being used for this competition. The main stadium is Estadio Universitario Beto Ávila, with the other three stadiums acting as minor venues.

Group Phase 

|}

Semifinal 

|}

Final 

|}

References

External links 
 Official Site

Latin American Series
2019 in baseball
International baseball competitions hosted by Mexico
Latin American Series
Latin American Series
Latin American Series
Sport in Veracruz